The 2018 Vermont gubernatorial election took place on November 6, 2018, to elect the Governor of Vermont, concurrently with the election of Vermont's Class I U.S. Senate seat, as well as other elections to the United States Senate in other states and elections to the United States House of Representatives and various state and local elections. Incumbent Republican Governor Phil Scott, who was first elected in 2016, was re-elected to a second term in office.  Hallquist's 40.4% was also the worst performance for a Democratic Party candidate since 2008. As of 2022 this election marked the last time a Democratic candidate won a county in a gubernatorial election in Vermont, as well as the last time the Republican candidate didn’t win by more than 40 points.

Background
Along with New Hampshire, Vermont is one of only two states where governors are elected to two-year terms. Republican Phil Scott was elected in the 2016 election.

Republican primary

Candidates

Declared
Phil Scott, incumbent governor

Eliminated in primary
 Keith Stern, businessman, Republican candidate for U.S. Representative in 2010, Independent candidate for U.S. Representative in 2006, Independent candidate for U.S. Senator in 2004

Endorsements

Debates and forums
CCTV Channel 17 Republican Primary Forum for Governor 7/25/2018
WCAX Democratic+Republican forum 7/31/2018

Results

Democratic primary

Candidates

Nominated
 Christine Hallquist, CEO of Vermont Electric Cooperative

Eliminated in primary
 James Ehlers,  executive director of Lake Champlain International and environmentalist
 John S. Rodgers, current State Senator from Essex County, former State Representative, and construction business owner (write-in candidate)
 Brenda Siegel, opioid epidemic and Brattleboro hurricane relief activist and worker, former community organizer for Bernie Sanders, southern Vermont nonprofit executive and founding director (also ran in Progressive primary)
 Ethan Sonneborn, freshman in high school who began his campaign when he was 13 years old. The election was held a few weeks before he entered his freshman year of high school. His campaign was focused on healthcare for all, the environment, economy, and education. Had he won, he would have been the youngest governor in American history. Vermont (as well as Kansas) does not have a minimum age requirement for governor.

Endorsements

Debates and forums
Brattleboro Community TV Democratic Gubernatorial Candidates Forum 6/6/2018
CCTV Channel 17 Democratic Primary Forum for Governor hosted by VTDigger 8/2/2018
WCAX Democratic+Republican forum 7/31/2018

Results

With this result, Christine Hallquist became the first openly transgender candidate for governor nominated by a major political party in the United States.

Progressive primary

Candidates

Eliminated in primary

Write-in
 Brenda Siegel (also ran in Democratic primary)

Endorsements

Debates and forums
Brattleboro Community TV Meet the Candidates for VT Governor 7/18/2018

Results

Libertarian nomination

Candidates

Withdrawn
 Seth Cournoyer (running for State Senate instead)

Liberty Union nomination

Candidates

Declared
 Emily Peyton, candidate for governor in 2014

Independents

Candidates

Declared
 Trevor Barlow, business and startup executive and founder, coach, as well as community and nonprofit board volunteer
 Cris Ericson, activist and perennial candidate also ran for congress.
Charles Laramie, activist, roofing architect, school teacher, United States Navy veteran, and Vermont Air National Guard
Stephen Marx, environmentalist

Write-in
 Tarl Warwick, far-right author, internet personality, and YouTuber

Withdrawn
 Joseph Barney, auto and agricultural mechanic, member of the Vermont Army National Guard, and school teacher

General election

Debates
Complete video of debate, October 17, 2018

Predictions

Endorsements

Polling

Results

Despite initial expectations of a potentially close race due to national blue wave, Scott easily won reelection in what became a difficult year for Republicans, winning by 15 percentage points.

References

External links
Candidates at Vote Smart
Candidates at Ballotpedia

Official campaign websites
Trevor Barlow (I) for Governor
Joseph Barney (I) for Governor
Christine Hallquist (D) for Governor
Charles Laramie (I) for Governor
Phil Scott (R) for Governor

2018 Vermont elections
2018
2018 United States gubernatorial elections